The National Unity Party (in Albanian: Partia e Unitetit Kombëtar) is a political party in Albania. It was founded in March 1991. It is an ultra-nationalist party and supports for pan-Albanian confederation. Ahead of the 2005 parliamentary elections, PUK formed a coalition together with three other parties grouped in the "Parties of the Social Spectrum of Albania". The coalition contested the elections as Parties of the Social Spectrum of Albania - National Unity Party (PSSSH-PUK). PSSSH-PUK failed to win any seats.

The party is led by Idajet Beqiri.

References

1991 establishments in Albania
Albanian nationalist parties
Political parties in Albania
Political parties established in 1991